The 2010–2011 Cyclo-cross Gazet van Antwerpen took place between 3 October 2010 and 20 February 2011. All eight rounds take place in Belgium.

Results and Standings

Race Results

Scoring system
Points are awarded for the first 20 finishers of each race:

On top of that, there is an "intermediate sprint" when passing the finish line at the end of lap two. The first three riders to cross the line receive three, two and one point respectively for first, second and third place.

Standings

External links
 Gazet van Antwerpen Trofee

Cyclo-cross BPost Bank Trophy
Gazet van Antwerpen
Gazet van Antwerpen